"Polaroid" is a song by English DJ and record producer Jonas Blue, English singer Liam Payne and Canadian singer Lennon Stella. It was released as a digital download on 5 October 2018 via Virgin EMI Records as the eighth single from Blue's compilation album Blue. It is also included on Payne’s debut studio album LP1. To date, It has sold two million units worldwide.

Critical reception
Broadway World called the track a "heaven sent slice of R&B pop replete with a truly anthemic chorus and an irresistible groove". Idolator felt the song had "shimmering production", an "irresistible chorus", and that Payne and Stella have "striking vocals" and chemistry.

Music video
A music video to accompany the release of "Polaroid" was first released onto YouTube on 19 October 2018. The video features a couple falling in love after taking a Polaroid picture together, and also features appearances by all three artists. Billboard commented that the video brings the "romantic dance song to life".

Charts

Weekly charts

Year-end charts

Certifications

Release history

References

 

2018 songs
2018 singles
Jonas Blue songs
Lennon Stella songs
Liam Payne songs
Number-one singles in Israel
Songs written by Romans (musician)
Songs written by Ed Drewett
Songs written by Jonas Blue
Songs written by JP Cooper